Bonomo is a surname. Notable people with the surname include:

Can Bonomo (born 1987), Turkish singer
Giovanna Maria Bonomo (1606–1670), Italian Roman Catholic nun
Giovanni Bonomo (born 1935), Silician mobster
Giovanni Cosimo Bonomo (1666–1696), Italian physician
Jacobello di Bonomo (active 1370–1390), Italian painter
Joe Bonomo, American essayist and rock and roll writer
Joe Bonomo (strongman) (1901–1978), American weight lifter, strongman, film stunt performer and actor
Justin Bonomo (born 1985), American professional poker player
Pietro Bonomo (1458–1546), Italian humanist, diplomat and Roman Catholic bishop
Stefano Bonomo (born 1993), American soccer player